Johnson Creek is a stream in the U.S. state of South Dakota. It is a tributary of the James River.

Johnson Creek was named after a pioneer settler.

See also
List of rivers of South Dakota

References

Rivers of Hanson County, South Dakota
Rivers of South Dakota